Le Chat et la Souris (US title: Cat and Mouse,  also known as Seven Suspects for Murder) is a 1975 French mystery film directed and written by Claude Lelouch. The film stars Michèle Morgan, Serge Reggiani and Jean-Pierre Aumont.

It tells the story of a rich widow, whose philandering husband is killed, and an inspector tries to solve the murder mystery.

Cast
Michèle Morgan as  Madame Richard 
Serge Reggiani as  Lechat 
Philippe Léotard as  Pierre Chemin 
Jean-Pierre Aumont as  Monsieur Richard 
Valérie Lagrange as  Manuelle 
Michel Peyrelon as  Germain 
Christine Laurent as  Christine 
Philippe Labro as  Philippe Lacombe 
Jacques François as  Le préfet de police 
Arlette Emmery as  Rose 
Jean Mermet   
Anne Libert as  Anne 
Judith Magre as  The lady with the dog
Yves Afonso as William Daube - le gauchiste

External links

1975 films
1970s comedy mystery films
French comedy mystery films
1970s French-language films
Films set in Paris
Films directed by Claude Lelouch
1975 comedy films
1970s French films